Erik Fredriksson (born 13 February 1943) is a former Swedish football referee. He officiated four World Cup games: Yugoslavia v Northern Ireland in 1982; Italy v Bulgaria (the tournament opening match) and USSR v Belgium in 1986; and Argentina v USSR in 1990.
Fredriksson also refereed the Euro 84 first-round tie between Belgium and Yugoslavia in Lens. 

He was also a linesman in the final of the 1986 World Cup between Argentina and West Germany.

References
Profile
New York Times report, June 16, 1990

1943 births
Living people
Swedish football referees
FIFA World Cup referees
1990 FIFA World Cup referees
1986 FIFA World Cup referees
1982 FIFA World Cup referees
UEFA Euro 1984 referees
UEFA Euro 1988 referees
AFC Asian Cup referees